The Kraken Wakes is an apocalyptic science fiction novel by John Wyndham, originally published by Michael Joseph in the United Kingdom in 1953, and first published in the United States in the same year by Ballantine Books under the title Out of the Deeps as a mass market paperback. 

The novel is structured as a book within a book. After a short scene-setting introduction, the novel is the book written by the protagonist, radio reporter Mike Watson, chronicling the events that took place when creatures from the deeps of the ocean attack humanity. Mike and his wife Phyllis work for the English Broadcasting Company (EBC) so are privy to decisions by government and scientific authorities who alternatively try to counter the "kraken"'s moves or stifle or massage news to prevent panic. The "kraken" are never seen, and their origin and level of intelligence, if any, are never discerned. They are only known by their acts of violence against humanity, and their weapons of choice are not of the sort envisioned by humanity.

The title is a reference to Alfred Tennyson's sonnet The Kraken.

Plot
The novel describes the course of an attack on humanity by creatures from the ocean depths, as told through the eyes of Mike Watson, who works for the English Broadcasting Company (EBC) with his wife and co-reporter Phyllis. A major role is also played by Professor Alastair Bocker – more clear-minded and far-sighted about the developing crisis than everybody else but often alienating people by telling brutally unvarnished and unwanted truths. 

Mike and Phyllis are witness to several events of the invasion, which proceeds in drawn-out phases; it takes years before the bulk of humanity even realises that the world has been invaded. In the first phase, objects from outer space land in the oceans. Mike and Phyllis happen to see five of the "fireballs" falling into the sea, from the ship where they are sailing on their honeymoon. Eventually the distribution of the objects' landing points – always at ocean depths, never on land – implies intelligence.

The aliens are speculated to come from a gas giant and thus can only survive under conditions of extreme pressures in which humans would be instantly crushed. The deepest parts of the oceans are the only parts of Earth in any way useful to them and they presumably have no need or use for the dry land or even the shallower parts of the seas. Bocker puts forward the theory that the two species could co-exist, hardly noticing each other's presence. Humanity nevertheless feels threatened by this new phenomenon – particularly since the newcomers show signs of intensive work to adapt the ocean deeps to their needs. A British bathysphere is sent down to investigate and is destroyed by the aliens with the loss of two lives. The British government responds by exploding a nuclear device in the same location. The aliens' technology proves formidable, and an American attempt to use a nuclear bomb ends in disaster. Ships all over the world begin to be attacked by unknown weapons and in each case are rapidly sunk, causing havoc to the world economy and trade. Humanity is not united in the face of the mounting threat because of the Cold War, with the two sides often attributing the effects of the alien attacks to their human opponents or refusing to co-operate because of their different political ideals and long-standing animosities and distrust.

Phase two of the war starts when the "kraken" also start "harvesting" the land by sending up "sea tanks" that capture humans from coastal settlements. Like much of what the "kraken" do, the reasons for these attacks are inscrutable. The Watsons witness one of these assaults on a Caribbean island. Eventually coastal settlements establish such defences against these "sea tank" raids that that they become far less frequent. But this only happens after raids are experienced on every continent. 

In the final phase, the aliens begin melting the polar ice caps, causing the sea level to rise. London and other ports are flooded, causing widespread social and political collapse. The government moves to Harrogate. The Watsons cover the story for the EBC until the radio (and organised social and political life in general) ceases to exist, whereupon they can only try to survive and escape a flooded London, using an acquired motor boat to a Cornish holiday cottage which, due to the floods, now exists on an island. Other coastal countries are also disastrously affected – there is a reference to masses of Dutch refugees fleeing into Germany, having "lost their centuries-long war with the sea". Ultimately, scientists in Japan develop an underwater ultrasonic weapon that kills the aliens. The population has been reduced to between a fifth and an eighth of its pre-invasion level and the world's climate has been significantly changed, with water levels 120 feet higher than before.

Plot narrative
Even at the end, humans have no clear idea what their opponents looked like. The most they have is some protoplasm which floated to the surface of the sea after the ultrasound weapon was used. As the protagonist states in the book, the book aims to demonstrate that an alien invasion of Earth could take a very different form from that in The War of the Worlds; publication of the book coincided with the release of 1953 film The War of the Worlds, an adaptation of H. G. Wells' classic work, which was both a critical and box office success.

Plot differences

Depending on the book's printed origin there are several changes to the plot:
 The US edition, entitled Out of the Deeps, cuts almost an entire chapter found in the British edition on how the Watsons gained possession of The Midge yacht, and their aborted attempt to use a dinghy to get to Cornwall. It simply states that Freddie Whittier "found it" one day.
 The US edition skips several paragraphs detailing Mike Watson's mental state and his several subconscious attempts to commit suicide, with only Phyllis preventing his success. Instead, the US edition just states that Mike goes on holiday.
 In the US epilogue, the Watsons are tracked down by Bocker via helicopter and he explains a great deal of what has happened to the world while Mike and Phyllis have been isolated – even describing the Japanese ultrasonic device in some detail.  In the UK edition they are instead approached by a neighbour in a sailboat, who gives them only a brief overview of what has happened in the world – excluding much of the detail and just mentioning that the Japanese have developed an ultrasonic device that is lethal in the depths of the sea. He tells them that their names have been broadcast on radio as important people whom the new "Council For Reconstruction" is wanting to locate and employ.
 The UK edition is less bleak than the US version, implying that humanity has already begun to rebuild and that civilisation survives – albeit at a lesser level than before.
 There are several changes for a US audience in terms of language and phraseology.

Reception
Groff Conklin, reviewing the American edition, characterised the novel as "sheer melodrama, sure, but melodrama spiced with wit [and] with pungent commentary on human foibles... A truly satisfying shocker." In F&SF, Boucher and McComas selected the novel as one of the best science fiction books of 1953, describing it as "humanly convincing"; they praised the novel as "a solid and admirable story of small-scale human reactions to vast terror." P. Schuyler Miller found this novel superior to The Day of the Triffids, citing its "characteristic, deceptive quietness." New York Times reviewer J. Francis McComas similarly noted that while the novel was "somewhat quieter in tone" than Triffids, it would "nevertheless exert an even more lasting effect on the imagination." One newspaper reviewer was less impressed, declaring that "[The novel's pace] is that of a slightly superior snail".

Adaptations

Radio 

The novel was adapted by John Keir Cross as a single 90-minute drama for the BBC Home Service, first broadcast on 28 April 1954. It was produced by Peter Watts. An adaptation by John Constable as a single 90-minute drama for BBC Radio 4 was first broadcast on 21 February 1998. It was produced by Susan Roberts, with music by Paul Gargill. This version was released on CD by BBC Audiobooks in 2007.

A 1965 radio adaption was recorded in Vancouver by the Canadian Broadcasting Corporation, starring Sam Paine, Shirley Broderick, Michael Irwin and Derek Walston. The duration was five half-hour shows.

BBC Radio 7 presented an unabridged reading by Stephen Moore of the novel in sixteen 30-minute episodes, produced by Susan Carson, and broadcast daily between 12 March and 2 April 2004.

On 28 May 2016 Radio 4 broadcast an adaptation by Val McDermid set in the present day, with some of the action moved from Harrogate to Birmingham and from Cornwall to Scotland.  It starred Paul Higgins as Michael and Tamsin Greig as Phyllis and featured an appearance by Scotland's First Minister Nicola Sturgeon as herself and was recorded with live accompaniment by the BBC Philharmonic orchestra. The duration is a one-hour show. The story-line starts with the attacks by sea-tanks on Escondida, which comes about page 140 of the 240-page book. The new elements the script incorporates include an upgrade to Wyndham's predicted 100-foot rise in sea level to the new worst-case figure of 70 metres envisioned over a thousand-year period by climate change experts. Such a rise sees the sea cover much of England.

Game 
In 2017, Charisma Entertainment signed an agreement with John Wyndham's estate for the exclusive rights to develop an immersive, interactive game version of the novel. Their adaptation of The Kraken Wakes is currently in production, and is due to be released in late 2022.

References

Bibliography
 .
 .
 .
 .

External links
 
 Review by Jo Walton, including comments on other Cosy catastrophes
 The Kraken Wakes game website

1953 British novels
1953 science fiction novels
Alien invasions in novels
Apocalyptic novels
Books about cephalopods
British science fiction novels
Kraken in popular culture
Michael Joseph books
Novels adapted into radio programs
Novels by John Wyndham